The 2015–16 Surinamese Eerste Klasse is the 60th season of the Eerste Klasse, the second highest football league competition of Suriname. The season will begin in November 2015, and will finish in June 2016.

Changes from 2014–15 

Nishan '42 and Robinhood was promoted to the Hoofdklasse.
Bomastar and SNL was relegated from the Hoofdklasse.

Teams

Stadia and Locations 
Note: Table lists in alphabetical order.

League table and results

Championship Playoff 

Deva Boys 1 - 3 Voorwarts (decided after extra-time)

Related competitions 
 2015–16 SVB Hoofdklasse
 2015–16 Surinamese Cup
 2015–16 SVB President's Cup

References 

Surinamese Eerste Klasse
Surinam